These are the named mountain ranges in Nevada. Some of them are quite small but still constitute distinct biomes.

A - D 

Anchorite Hills
Antelope Range (Nye County)
Antelope Range (Pershing County)
Antelope Range (White Pine County)
Ararat Hills
Arrow Canyon Range
Augusta Mountains
Badger Mountains
Bare Mountain (Nevada)
Barnett Hills
Battle Mountains
Belted Range
Bilk Creek Mountains
Bird Spring Range
Black Canyon Range
Black Mountains (Nevada)
Black Rock Range
Bloody Run Hills
Blow Sand Mountains
Blue Wing Mountains
Bodie Mountains
Bone Mountains
Bristol Range
Broken Hills
Bruneau Range
Buck Creek Mountains
Buckskin Range
Buffalo Hills
Bullfrog Hills
Bull Run Mountains (Nevada)
Bunejug Mountains
Buried Hills
Burnt Springs Range
Butte Mountains

Cactus Range
 Calico Hills
Cambridge Hills
Candelaria Hills
Carson Range
Castle Mountains
Cedar Mountains (Nevada)
Cedar Range
Cherry Creek Range
Chief Range
Clan Alpine Mountains
Clover Mountains
Cocoon Mountains
Copper Mountains
Cortez Mountains
Cucomungo Mountains
Cuprite Hills
Curnow Range
Dead Camel Mountains
Deep Creek Range
Delamar Mountains
Delano Mountains
Desatoya Mountains
Desert Creek Mountains
Desert Hills (Nevada)
Desert Mountains
Desert Range
Devils Hole Hills
Diabase Hills
Diamond Mountains
Division Range
Dixie Hills
Dolly Varden Mountains
Double H Mountains
Dry Hills
Dry Lake Range
Duck Creek Range

E - H 

East Desert Range
East Gate Range
East Humboldt Range
East Mormon Mountains
East Pahranagat Range
East Range
Egan Range
Elbow Range
Eldorado Mountains
Eleana Range
Elk Mountains (Nevada)
Elko Hills
Ely Springs Range
Eugene Mountains
Excelsior Mountains
Fairview Range (Lincoln County)
Fairview Range (Churchill County)
Fernley Hills
Fish Creek Mountains
Fish Creek Range
Flowery Range
Fortification Range
Fort Sage Mountains
Fox Creek Range
Fox Range
Frenchman Range
French Mountains
Gabbs Valley Range
Gap Mountains
Garfield Hills
General Thomas Hills

Gillis Range
Golden Gate Range
Goldfield Hills
Gold Mountain Range
Goose Creek Mountains
Goshute Mountains
Granite Range (Elko County)
Granite Range (Washoe County)
Grant Range
Grapevine Mountains
Gray Hills
Groom Range
Halfpint Range
Hannan Range
Hays Canyon Range
H D Range
Highland Range (Clark County)
Highland Range (Lincoln County)
High Rock Canyon Hills
Hiko Range
Hiller Mountains
Hog Ranch Mountains
Home Camp Range
Horse Range
Hot Creek Range
Hot Springs Mountains
Hot Springs Range
Humboldt Range
Hungry Range
Huntoon Mountains

I - M 

Ichabod Range
Idaho Canyon Range
Independence Mountains
Jackson Mountains
Jarbidge Mountains
Johnnie Range
Jumbled Hills
Junction House Range
Kamma Mountains
Kawich Range
Kern Mountains
Kinsley Mountains
Lahontan Mountains
Lake Range
Last Chance Range (Nevada)
Las Vegas Range
Leach Range
Leppy Hills
Limestone Hills
Little High Rock Mountains
Lodi Hills
Lost Creek Hills
Louderback Mountains
Lucy Gray Mountains

Mahogany Hills
Mahogany Mountains
Majuba Mountains
Mallard Hills
Martin Creek Mountains
Marys River Range
Massacre Range
Maverick Springs Range
McCullough Mountains
Meadow Valley Mountains
Medicine Range
Monitor Hills
Monitor Range
Montana Mountains
Monte Cristo Mountains
Monte Cristo Range (Nevada)
Montezuma Range
Mormon Mountains
Mosquito Mountain
Mount Irish Range
Mountain Boy Range
Muddy Mountains

N - S 

Needle Mountains (Nevada-Utah)
Needle Range
Newberry Mountains
New Pass Range
New York Mountains
Nightingale Mountains
North Muddy Mountains
North Pahroc Range
Osgood Mountains
Pah Rah Range
Pahranagat Range
Painted Point Range
Palmetto Mountains
Pancake Range
Papoose Range
Paradise Range
Park Range
Paymaster Ridge
Peavine Mountain
Peko Hills
Pequop Mountains
Petersen Mountain
Pilot Mountains
Pilot Range
Pine Forest Range
Pine Grove Hills
Pine Nut Mountains
Pinon Range
Pinto Peak Range
Pintwater Range
Pioche Hills
Piute Range
Poker Brown Mountains
Quinn Canyon Range
Rainey Mountains
Ranger Mountains
Rawhide Hills
Resting Spring Range
Reveille Range
River Mountains
Roberts Mountains
Royston Hills
Ruby Mountains

Sahwave Mountains
Salmon River Range
San Antonio Mountains
Sand Hills (Nevada)
Sand Range
Sand Springs Range
Santa Renia Mountains
Santa Rosa Range
Schell Creek Range
Seaman Range
Selenite Range
Sentinel Hills
Seven Troughs Range
Sheep Creek Range
Sheep Range
Sheephead Mountains
Shoshone Mountain
Shoshone Mountains
Shoshone Range
Silver Peak Range
Simpson Park Mountains
Singatse Range
Sinkavata Hills
Skull Mountain
Slate Ridge
Slumbering Hills
Smoke Creek Mountains
Snake Mountains
Snake Range
Snowstorm Mountains
Sonoma Range
South Pahroc Range
South Virgin Mountains
Specter Range
Spotted Range
Spring Mountains
Spruce Mountain
Stillwater Range
Sulphur Spring Range
Sweetwater Mountains
Sylvania Mountains

T - Z 

Terraced Hills
Terril Mountains
Tikaboo Range
Timpahute Range
Toana John Mountains
Toano Range
Tobin Range
Toiyabe Range
Toquima Range
Trinity Range
Truckee Range
Tule Springs Hills
Tuscarora Mountains
Virginia Mountains
Virginia Range
Virgin Mountains
Volcanic Hills (Nevada)

Wassuk Range
Weepah Hills
Wellington Hills
West Gate Range
West Humboldt Range
West Range
Whistler Range
White Mountains (California)
White Pine Range
White River Range
White Rock Mountains
White Throne Mountains
Wild Horse Range
Wilson Creek Range
Windermere Hills
Wood Hills
Worthington Mountains
Yellow Hills
Yucca Mountain

See also 
 Geography section of the Nevada article
 List of mountain ranges of Arizona
 List of mountain ranges of California
 List of mountain ranges of Oregon
 List of mountain ranges of the Lower Colorado River Valley
 List of mountain ranges - Nellis & Wildlife 5 range region
 List of valleys of Nevada

References 
 Alvin R. McLane, Silent Cordilleras: The Mountain Ranges of Nevada.  (Reno: Camp Nevada Monograph #4, 1978)
 Geographic Names Information System (GNIS), USGS

 
Nevada, List of mountain ranges of
Nevada
Mountain peaks